Mahaska is a city in Washington County, Kansas, United States.  As of the 2020 census, the population of the city was 46.  It is located 1 mile south of the Nebraska state line.

History
Mahaska was founded in 1887 by L. Bonham. It was likely named for Chief Mahaska.

The first post office in Mahaska was established in December 1887.

In 1854, the Sixth Principal Meridian or 40th Parallel, approximately 1 mile northwest of the present day Mahaska.  Originally marked in 1856, this site was the beginning point for land surveys for all land in Kansas, Nebraska, three-fourths of Colorado, most of Wyoming, and part of South Dakota.  The original marker was rediscovered in 1976, then a new monument was dedicated in 1987.

Geography
Mahaska is located at  (39.987024, -97.352376).

Demographics

2010 census
As of the census of 2010, there were 83 people, 30 households, and 23 families residing in the city. The racial makeup of the city was 97.6% White and 2.4% from two or more races.

There were 30 households, of which 43.3% had children under the age of 18 living with them, 66.7% were married couples living together, 10.0% had a female householder with no husband present, and 23.3% were non-families. 20.0% of all households were made up of individuals. The average household size was 2.77 and the average family size was 3.22.

The median age in the city was 37.5 years. 33.7% of residents were under the age of 18; 4.8% were between the ages of 18 and 24; 28.8% were from 25 to 44; 16.8% were from 45 to 64; and 15.7% were 65 years of age or older. The gender makeup of the city was 54.2% male and 45.8% female.

2000 census
As of the census of 2000, there were 107 people, 39 households, and 31 families residing in the city. The racial makeup of the city was 93.46% White, 0.93% African American, 1.87% Native American, and 3.74% from two or more races.

There were 39 households, out of which 38.5% had children under the age of 18 living with them, 64.1% were married couples living together, 12.8% had a female householder with no husband present, and 20.5% were non-families. 17.9% of all households were made up of individuals, and 7.7% had someone living alone who was 65 years of age or older. The average household size was 2.74 and the average family size was 3.03.

In the city, the population was spread out, with 31.8% under the age of 18, 7.5% from 18 to 24, 26.2% from 25 to 44, 23.4% from 45 to 64, and 11.2% who were 65 years of age or older. The median age was 34 years. For every 100 females, there were 101.9 males. For every 100 females age 18 and over, there were 97.3 males.

The median income for a household in the city was $24,375, and the median income for a family was $26,250. Males had a median income of $20,000 versus $19,583 for females. The per capita income for the city was $13,162. There were 19.2% of families and 21.6% of the population living below the poverty line, including 30.4% of under eighteens and none of those over 64.

Education
The community is served by Washington County USD 108 public school district, which formed in 2006 by the consolidation of North Central USD 221 and Washington USD 222. The Washington County High School mascot is Tigers.

Mahaska High School was closed through school unification. The Mahaska High School mascot was Mahaska Cardinals.

Notable people
 Charles McAtee - former director of Kansas prison system

See also
 National Register of Historic Places listings in Washington County, Kansas

References

Further reading

External links

 Mahaska - Directory of Public Officials
 Mahaska city map, KDOT

Cities in Kansas
Cities in Washington County, Kansas